Patrick Calhoun Caldwell (March 10, 1801 – November 22, 1855) was a U.S. Representative from South Carolina.

Born near Newberry, South Carolina, Caldwell was graduated from South Carolina College (now the University of South Carolina) at Columbia in 1820.
He studied law.
He was admitted to the bar in 1822 and commenced practice in South Carolina.
He served as member of the State house of representatives 1838-1839.

Caldwell was elected as a Democrat to the Twenty-seventh Congress (March 4, 1841 – March 3, 1843).
He was an unsuccessful candidate for reelection to the Twenty-eighth Congress.
He served in the State senate in 1848.
He died in South Carolina on November 22, 1855.

Sources

1801 births
1855 deaths
Democratic Party members of the South Carolina House of Representatives
Democratic Party members of the United States House of Representatives from South Carolina
Democratic Party South Carolina state senators
19th-century American politicians
People from Newberry, South Carolina